Nakhon Si Thammarat Kingdom, Nagara Sri Dharmarashtra or Kingdom of Ligor, was one of the major constituent city states (mueang) of the Siamese kingdoms of Sukhothai and later Ayutthaya and controlled a sizeable part of the Malay peninsula. Its capital was the eponymous city of Nakhon Si Thammarat in what is now Southern Thailand.

History

Sukhothai period 
Most historians identify the Tambralinga kingdom (existing c. 10th to 13th century) with a precursor of Nakhon Si Thammarat. During the late-1st and early-2nd millennium CE, Tai peoples expanded in mainland Southeast Asia. By the 13th century, they made Nakhon Si Thammarat one of their mueang (city states). The exact circumstances of the Tai taking over the earlier Buddhist and Indianised kingdom at this location remain unclear. 

The Ramkhamhaeng stele of 1283 (or 1292) lists Nakhon Si Thammarat as the southernmost tributary kingdom of Sukhothai, probably ruled by Sri Thammasokaraj, a relative of King Ram Khamhaeng. Nakhon Si Thammarat's Buddhist Theravada tradition was a model for the whole Sukhothai kingdom. Exemplary for the Southeast Asian Mandala model, the dependency towards Sukhothai was only personal, not institutional. Therefore, after Ram Khaemhaeng's death, Nakhon Si Thammarat regained its independence and became the dominant Thai mueang on the Malay peninsula.

Ayutthaya period 
In the Old Javanese Desawarnana document of 1365, the Majapahit kingdom recognised Nakhon Si Thammarat as belonging to Siam. The Palatine law of King Trailok dated 1468, listed Nakhon Si Thammarat as one of eight "great cities" (phraya maha nakhon) belonging to the Ayutthaya kingdom. Nevertheless, it maintained its own dynasty and had vassal states of its own, which it mediated to Ayutthaya (again a typical feature of the Mandala model with its tiered levels of power). Under king Naresuan (r. 1590–1605) it became instead a "first class province" (mueang ek). However, the post of provincial governor was still quasi-hereditary and usually handed down from father to son within the old Nakhon Si Thammarat dynasty. It was the most important among Ayutthaya's southern provinces and enjoyed a primacy vis-à-vis the other provinces on the Malay Peninsula. Its role in overseas trade (involving Dutch and Portuguese merchants) resulted in the province's substantial wealth and contributed to a high level of confidence and claim of autonomy in relation to the central power.

During the Ayutthayan succession conflict of 1629, Nakhon Si Thammarat rebelled against the new king Prasat Thong. The usurper sent the influential Japanese adventurer Yamada Nagamasa with his mercenary force to quell the rebellion and made him governor and lord of Nakhon Si Thammarat for a short time. Another insurrection of Nakhon Si Thammarat against the capital took place after the Siamese revolution of 1688 when the local ruler refused to accept the accession of usurper king Phetracha.

Thonburi period 
After the fall of Ayutthaya in 1767, Nakhon Si Thammarat again enjoyed a short period of independence, including its subordinate provinces on the Malay peninsula, but was subdued by Taksin in 1769 on his mission to reunite Siam.

Rattanakosin period 
Under Rama I, the rank of the Lord of Nakhon Si Thammarat was demoted from a vassal ruler to a mere governor of a first-class province and his control over the Northern Malay sultanates (including Patani) was taken away, instead awarding them to the governor of Songkhla. Nakhon Si Thammarat was supervised by the Kalahom (Minister of the Southern provinces). In 1821 and 1831 however, kings Rama II and Rama III again tasked the governor of Nakhon Si Thammarat to quell rebellions in the Malay sultanate of Kedah.

Integration into the Siamese central state 
With the Thesaphiban reform of Prince Damrong Rajanubhab at the end of the 19th century the kingdom was finally fully absorbed into Siam. A new administrative entity named monthon (circle) was created, each supervising several provinces. Monthon Nakhon Si Thammarat, established in 1896, covered those areas on the east coast of the peninsula, i.e. the provinces Songkhla, Nakhon Si Thammarat and Phatthalung.

Naksat cities 

According to the 16th-century Southern Thai Chronicles of Nakhon Si Thammarat and the Chronicles of Phra That Nakhon, Nakhon Si Thammarat was surrounded by a chain of 12 inter-linked cities, or Mueang, on the Malay Peninsula, called the Naksat cities. According to these accounts, the cities acted as an outer shield, surrounding the capital Nakhon Si Thammarat (Ligor), and were connected by land so that help could be sent from one city to another in the event of surprise attacks.

The Thai term naksat (from Sanskrit nakshatra) refers to the lunar calendar system with a duodenary cycle of years (Pi Naksat), based on the Chinese zodiac, with each year being associated with a particular animal.

M.C. Chand Chirayu Rajani identified 11 of the 12 cities and their associated zodiac emblems with the following locations on the Malay peninsula: Narathiwat (Rat), Pattani (Ox), Kelantan (Tiger), Kedah (Dragon), Phattalung (Snake), Trang (Horse), Chumphon (Goat), Krabi (Monkey), Tha Chana (Rooster), Phuket (Dog), Kraburi (Pig). The exact location of Mueang Pahang, identified with the Rabbit, is unknown.

However, there is no historic evidence that Nakhon Si Thammarat actually controlled these cities. Other reports from that period rarely describe Ligor as having any special role on the Malay peninsula. The account in the chronicles seems to reflect the Siamese (Thai) claims to suzerainty over the Malay regions of the south during the mid-Ayutthaya period.

List of rulers 
The following table is a list of rulers of Nakhon Si Thammarat. The english terms "governor" and "province" are translations used by Munro-Hays in his book. However, there is strong evidence that both the rulers themselves and European powers regarded these rulers as kings in their own right. The Siamese term for Nakhon Si Thammarat changes over time. In the Palatine Law of 1458, it is a prathetsarat (often translated as tributary state) and the ruler entitled a chao phraya. Chao phraya is a general term for kings. For example, the main river running through Bangkok is the Chao Phraya River, or River of Kings.  

During the reign of Naresuan, the title prathetsarat was abandoned and Nakhon became a first-class "city". Again, the translation "city" is misleading and comes from the Thai mueang, which is also used for the capital of Siam, Ayutthaya. Official titles for cities and rulers in pre-modern Siam is complex. We know Nakhon was closely allied with Siam and that Ayutthaya became involved in succession politics, sometimes appointing outsiders to the position. However, most of the rulers were chosen from among the ruling elite of Nakhon.  

Source:

References

Further reading 
Stuart Munro-Hay. Nakhon Sri Thammarat - The Archaeology, History and Legends of a Southern Thai Town. 

Former countries in Thai history
15th-century disestablishments
States and territories established in the 1st millennium
Indianized kingdoms
History of Nakhon Si Thammarat
Tai history
Srivijaya
Medieval Thailand
Early Modern Thailand
Thonburi Kingdom
13th century in Thailand
13th-century establishments in Thailand